Gherăseni is a commune in Buzău County, Muntenia, Romania, 17 km south-east of Buzău, the county capital. It is composed of three villages: Gherăseni, Cremenea and Sudiți.

Location
Gherăseni is located on the Bărăgan plain. The only river crossing the commune is Călmățui, a tributary of the Danube.

The commune neighbours Țintești to the north, Smeeni to the east, Mihăileşti to the south, Movila Banului to the southwest, and Costești to the west.

History
The name Gherăseni is connected to the name of Ioan (Emanuil) Gerassy, a Greek who had obtained a licence on the boyar monopoly of manufacturing alcoholic beverages in Bucharest during the rule of Alexandru II Ghica (1834-1842). He owned Câmpineanca, Siliște and Rotunda estates, which he had bought in the late 1820s. 

Rotunda estate included a large village which featured an Orthodox church. Gerassy managed to convince the inhabitants of that village to move to the present-day location of Gherăseni, 1 km away from the Cremenea village. The first people to settle in the new location apparently arrived around 1829. The Gerassy family also built a new church and a school on the spot.

In 1905, financial difficulties forced Nicolae Gerassy, Ioan's son, to sell the estates to one Stan Vasile.

References

 Official site

1820s establishments in Romania
Communes in Buzău County
Localities in Muntenia